Gaven  is a rural residential locality in the City of Gold Coast, Queensland, Australia.

Geography 
It is immediately north of Nerang. The eastern boundary of the suburb is marked by the Pacific Motorway.

History 

It was named after Eric Gaven, a councillor on the Nerang Shire Council from 1935 to 1949 and chairman of the newly-established Albert Shire Council in 1949-1950. He won the seat of Southport at the 1950 Queensland state election for the Country Party. He held the seat for 10 years before it was abolished for the 1960 Queensland state election and Gaven then won the new seat of South Coast, which he held until 1966. He won the seat of Southport at the 1950 Queensland state election for the Country Party. He held the seat for 10 years before it was abolished for the 1960 Queensland state election and Gaven then won the new seat of South Coast, which he held until 1966.

Gaven State School opened on 27 January 1995 but is now within the boundaries of neighbouring Oxenford.

In the  Gaven had a population of 1,583 people.

References

External links 
 

Suburbs of the Gold Coast, Queensland
Localities in Queensland